David D. Bolland (born June 5, 1986) is a Canadian former professional ice hockey player.

Bolland was drafted by the Chicago Blackhawks in the second round (32nd overall) of the 2004 NHL Entry Draft. While playing junior hockey in the Ontario Hockey League (OHL), Bolland helped the London Knights capture the 2005 Memorial Cup. He also competed at the 2006 World Junior Championships, where he helped Canada capture the gold medal. Bolland also skated in the American Hockey League (AHL) for the Norfolk Admirals and Rockford IceHogs.

He has won the Stanley Cup with the Blackhawks in both 2010 and 2013, and scored the Stanley Cup-winning goal for Chicago in 2013 with less than a minute remaining in regulation. Aside from the Blackhawks, Bolland also played for the Toronto Maple Leafs and Florida Panthers.

Playing career
Bolland was born June 5, 1986, in Etobicoke, a district of Toronto, Ontario, and lived in the Mimico neighbourhood. He started playing hockey at the local arena, Mimico Arena, where he played for the Queensway Canadiens. He then played minor hockey for the Toronto Red Wings in the Greater Toronto Hockey League (GTHL) from 2000 until 2002. The Red Wings would go on to win the OHL All Ontario Bantam Championship, with Bolland recording four points in the championship game. He played in the 2000 Quebec International Pee-Wee Hockey Tournament with the Toronto Red Wings.

Junior
While playing for the Toronto Red Wings, Bolland was selected in the first round, eighth overall, of the 2002 Ontario Hockey League Priority Selection by the London Knights. He made his OHL debut with the Knights during the 2002–03 season, where he recorded 17 points in 63 games. During his sophomore OHL season, Bolland increased his offensive contributions to the Knights with 37 goals and 30 assists for 67 points. He was also named the club's Most Improved Player. Bolland represented the Western Conference at the 2004 OHL All-Star Game and was also chosen to participate in the 2004 CHL Top Prospects Game. Heading into the 2004 NHL Entry Draft, Bolland was the eighth ranked North American skater by the NHL's Central Scouting Bureau. Bolland was selected by the Chicago Blackhawks in the second round, 32nd overall, of the 2004 NHL Entry Draft.

Professional
Bolland made his NHL debut against the Vancouver Canucks on October 25, 2006. Bolland started the 2007–08 season with the Rockford IceHogs of the American Hockey League, though spent the majority of his second professional season with the Blackhawks. He recorded his first NHL point on October 31, 2007, against the Dallas Stars and scored his first NHL goal on December 16 against the Florida Panthers. Bolland scored a game-winning overtime goal against the Toronto Maple Leafs on November 22, 2008. On May 22, 2009, Bolland had two assists for the Blackhawks in the first 10 minutes of the 2009 Western Conference Finals against the Detroit Red Wings. On June 9, 2010, Bolland became a Stanley Cup champion when the Blackhawks defeated the Philadelphia Flyers and won the Stanley Cup, ending their 49-year drought. On June 24, 2013, Bolland scored the game-winning goal in the final minute of Game 6 of the 2013 Stanley Cup Finals over the Boston Bruins, leading the Blackhawks to their second Stanley Cup title in four years.

During the 2013 NHL Entry Draft, the Blackhawks traded Bolland to the Toronto Maple Leafs in exchange for a second-round and fourth-round pick in 2013 and a fourth in 2014.

On July 1, 2014, the Florida Panthers signed Bolland to a five-year, $27.5 million contract. Over the next two seasons, Bolland appeared in just 78 of a possible 164 games due to injuries.

On August 25, 2016, the Panthers traded Bolland and Lawson Crouse to the Arizona Coyotes in exchange for a 2017 conditional third-round pick and a 2018 conditional second-round pick. However, he never played a game for the club. His last official NHL game was December 12, 2015 (as a member of the Panthers) and has yet to play again due to a back injury.

Career statistics

Regular season and playoffs

International

Awards and achievements
2003–04 OHL Third All-Star Team
Played in the 2004 CHL Top Prospects Game.
2005 Memorial Cup Champion with London Knights
2004–05 OHL All-Star
2005–06 OHL First All-Star Team
2005–06 OHL Jim Mahon Memorial Trophy winner
Captain of Team OHL in Canada/Russia Series, November 2005.
Stanley Cup Champion (2010, 2013)
Stanley Cup-winning goal scorer, 2013

References

External links
 
 
 Bolland's profile on the Ontario Hockey League site
 Bolland's profile on hockeysfuture.com
 Bolland was named AHL Rookie of the month in February 2007
 Article on Bolland and the 2006 WJC tournament

1986 births
Living people
Canadian ice hockey centres
Chicago Blackhawks draft picks
Chicago Blackhawks players
Florida Panthers players
London Knights players
Norfolk Admirals players
Portland Pirates players
Rockford IceHogs (AHL) players
Sportspeople from Etobicoke
Ice hockey people from Toronto
Stanley Cup champions
Toronto Maple Leafs players